Johnatan Cañaveral Vargas (born 2 November 1996) is a Colombian cyclist, who currently rides for UCI ProTeam .

Major results

2017
 3rd Road race, National Under-23 Road Championships
2018
 2nd Gran Premio Comite Olímpico Nacional
 4th Overall Vuelta a Costa Rica
1st Young rider classification
1st Stage 8
 4th Overall Circuit des Ardennes
1st Young rider classification
 10th GP Adria Mobil
 10th Giro del Belvedere
2019
 1st Stage 2 Vuelta a Boyacá
 7th Overall Vuelta Ciclista Comunidad de Madrid
2020
 8th Overall Turul Romaniei

References

External links

1996 births
Living people
Colombian male cyclists
People from Pereira, Colombia
21st-century Colombian people